Habibi is an American rock band from Brooklyn, New York. They are a blend of psychedelic rock and sixties girl group harmonies. The name Habibi means "my love," an Arabic word vocalist Rahill Jamalifard grew up using despite her Iranian origin (the term is not in use in Iran).

Career 
In 2011, former Detroiters, Lenaya Lynch and Rahill Jamalifard, decided to form a band blending their love of psychedelic garage rock and girl group harmonies. They joined Erin Campbell and Karen Isabel, musicians from the Brooklyn rock and roll scene, who both went to LaGuardia School of the Arts. They grew in popularity and found themselves playing the SXSW festival in Austin and the CMJ festival. They signed to Born Bad Records and released the self-titled 7-inch, Habibi. 

In 2012, Habibi's song "Sweetest Talk" was featured in actor/director James Franco's short film series Episodes of an Untitled Film. Lynch left the band due to an emergency in 2012 and Habibi found a replacement with the guitarist Caroline Partamian, who toured with the band for a year and until the return of Lynch in 2013. In 2014, Burger Records released their debut full-length LP, Habibi.

Influences 
The sound of Habibi is influenced both by the garage rock/girl group sounds from Detroit as well as the Middle Eastern melody structures that were shared by Lynch and Jamalifard, who is herself of Iranian descent. Jamalifard influences are also related to her ancestry mentioning “Iran, gypsies, nomads, the inspiration of poets like Hafez . . . my travels within the country.” In 2012, Interview Magazine wrote  "Influenced by grunge, punk, hip-hop, and Motown, Habibi's sound—and band members—meet somewhere in the middle."

Members

Current line-up 
 Rahill Jamalifard - Lead Vocals, Tambourine
 Lenaya "Lenny" Lynch - Guitar, Vocals
 Lyla Vander - Drums
 Ana Becker - Guitar, Vocals
 Yukary - Bass

Past members 
 Caroline Partamian - Guitar, Vocals
 Erin Campbell - Bass, Guitar, Vocals
 Karen Isabel - Drums

Discography

Studio albums
Habibi (2014)
Anywhere But Here (2020)

EPs
Habibi (2012)
La Luz / Habibi (2015)
Cardamom Garden (2018)

See also 
 Burger Records discography

References 

Musical groups established in 2011
Musical groups from Brooklyn
2011 establishments in New York City
Iranian-American culture